Senator Strickland may refer to:

Brian Strickland (born 1983), Georgia State Senate
Randolph Strickland (1823–1880), Michigan State Senate
Ted L. Strickland (1932–2012), Colorado State Senate
Tony Strickland (born 1970), California State Senate